Danilo Alves may refer to:

 Danilo Alves (footballer, born 1989), Brazilian football midfielder
 Danilo Alves (footballer, born 1991), Brazilian football forward
 Danilo Alves (footballer, born 1996), Brazilian football winger